Jennifer Lee Lacy (born March 21, 1983) is an American professional basketball player.

Lacy graduated from Agoura Hills High School in Agoura Hills, California in 2002. She played college basketball at Pepperdine, although she was recruited by Arizona, California, UC Santa Barbara, and Washington. She joined the WNBA in 2006. She is 6 feet, 3 inches tall and weighs 175 pounds.

Lacy's father, Lee Lacy, is a former Major League Baseball player. She has two brothers, Eric and Michael.

She played for Beijing Shougang in China during the 2008–09 WNBA off-season.

College statistics

Source

References

External links
WNBA Profile

1983 births
Living people
American women's basketball players
American expatriate basketball people in China
Atlanta Dream players
LGBT basketball players
Pepperdine Waves women's basketball players
Phoenix Mercury players
Small forwards
Tulsa Shock players
Los Angeles Sparks players
Connecticut Sun players

Beijing Great Wall players